José María Prada Oterino (31 March 1925 – 13 August 1978) was a Spanish film and television actor. He appeared in more than 80 films and television shows between 1954 and 1978.

Partial filmography

 Comedians (1954) - Decorador
 Felices Pascuas (1954) - Barbero (uncredited)
 The Coyote (1955) - Barman
 The Coyote's Justice (1956) - Barman (uncredited)
 También hay cielo sobre el mar (1956) - Maestro
 The Rocket from Calabuch (1956) - Juan (voice, uncredited)
 Sonatas (1959) - Molinero
 Juanito (1960) - Dr. Ramiro
 La gran familia (1962) - Locutor de radio
 The Executioner (1963) - Vigilante con botella de champán
 La verbena de la Paloma (1963)
 Aquella joven de blanco (1964) - Priest
 La Tía Tula (1964) - Sacerdote
 Faites vos jeux, mesdames (1965)
 The Art of Living (1965) - Gálvez
 Crimen de doble filo (1965) - Sixto Mendiola
 La familia y... uno más (1965) - (uncredited)
 La Barrera (1966) - Inspector
 La caza (1966) - Luis
 The Diabolical Dr. Z (1966) - Policeman (uncredited)
 La busca (1966) - Hornero
 Amador (1966) - Jesús
 Último encuentro (1967) - Álvaro
 El último sábado (1967)
 De cuerpo presente (1967) - Barlow
 Club de solteros (1967) - Don Cosme
 Javier y los invasores del espacio (1967)
 Oscuros sueños de agosto (1968) - Dr. Segura
 Los flamencos (1968) - Arturo
 Villa Rides (1968) - Major
 Persecución hasta Valencia (1968)
 Ditirambo (1969) - Jaime Normando
 Adiós cordera (1969) - Rufo
 Mónica Stop (1969) - Don Justo
 The Bloody Judge (1970) - Palafox (uncredited)
 Long Live the Bride and Groom (1970) - Pepito
 Cuadrilátero (1970) - Young Miranda
 Goya, a Story of Solitude (1971) - Sebastián
 Pancho Villa (1972) - Luis
 Cao-Xa (1973) - El sacerdote
 Corazón solitario (1973) - personaje de Jacques Dufilho (voice)
 Anna and the Wolves (1973) - José
 A Brief Vacation (1973) - Ciranni
  (1973)
 El asesino está entre los trece (1973) - Martin
 Todos los gritos del silencio (1975) - Montan
 Leonor (1975)
 Sept morts sur ordonnance (1975) - Simon Mauvagne
 El poder del deseo (1975) - Sorribes
 La casa (1976) - Noel
 La lozana andaluza (1976) - Don Rodrigo
 El segundo poder (1976) - Córcoles
 El caballero de la mano en el pecho (1976)
 The Man Who Knew Love (1977) - Gran Inquisidor
 Niñas... al salón (1977) - Don Gustavo
 Pensione paura (1978) - Hotel guest
 Rebeldía (1978) - Don Ricardo
 Traffic Jam (1979) - Ricardo, Mercedes driver
 Mama Turns 100 (1979) - José (uncredited)

External links

1925 births
1978 deaths
20th-century Spanish male actors
Spanish male film actors
Male actors from Castilla–La Mancha